Hope Aldrich Rockefeller (born May 17, 1938) is a retired American newspaper publisher and businesswoman.

Rockefeller was born on May 17, 1938, the eldest daughter of philanthropist John Davison Rockefeller III and his wife Blanchette Ferry Hooker. She is a great-granddaughter of John D. Rockefeller. Her paternal grandparents were John D. Rockefeller, Jr. and Abby Aldrich Rockefeller and her maternal grandfather was Elon Huntington Hooker.

Early life and career 
She grew up in New York City and Mount Pleasant, New York. Hope pursued a career in journalism and has worked for Long Island's Newsday, Beijing's China Daily, New York's The Village Voice, and the Washington Monthly. In 1978, she joined Santa Fe Reporter in Santa Fe, New Mexico to work for Richard McCord as a news reporter. In 1988, she acquired the newspaper from him, and became a publisher.

Private 
Rockefeller married John Spencer (born February 3, 1930) on July 5, 1959, in Irvington, New York. They resided in Santa Fe, New Mexico were she published her weekly newspaper until their divorce. They had three sons;
David "Dave" Hooker Spencer (born December 1, 1961), a Republican advocate
Benjamin Murray Spencer (December 11, 1964 - June 24, 1989)
Theodore Spencer (born August 3, 1966), a trustee of the Rockefeller Brothers Fund
In 1996, Rockefeller was New Mexico's third wealthiest resident, with an approximate net worth of $250 million ($475 million adjusted to inflation in 2022). After her divorce and retirement she relocated to Corona del Mar, California were she is a resident to this day. Her former husband moved back to Vermont.

See also
Rockefeller family
Jay Rockefeller

References

SELECTED BIBLIOGRAPHY OF BOOKS ON THE ROCKEFELLER FAMILY AND THEIR PHILANTHROPIES at The Rockefeller Archive Center

Rockefeller family
Winthrop family
1938 births
Living people
People from Santa Fe, New Mexico
American people of English descent
American people of German descent
20th-century American journalists